Organizations Paulo Octavio is a conglomerate of companies belonging to the Paulo Octávio, founded in 1975 with headquarters in Brasília, Federal District, concentrated specifically in the areas of construction, real estate, hotels, shopping centers, insurance, consortium and communication.

Hotels
Brasília Alvorada Hotel
Brasília Palace Hotel
Kubitschek Plaza Hotel
Manhattan Plaza Hotel
Saint Paul Hotel
Studio In Residence

Shopping centers
Brasília Shopping
Taguatinga Shopping
Terraço Shopping

Marketing
Office C

Radio
JK FM
Mix FM Brasília
Radio Globo Brasília
Rádio Bandeirantes Brasília

Television
TV Brasília (in partnership with the Diários Associados)

Consortium
CTM Bali

Insurance
Terrace Insurance Brokers

Construction
Home Construction

Property
Paulo Octavio Real Estate

External links
 website

Mass media companies of Brazil
Conglomerate companies of Brazil
Mass media in Brasília
Real estate companies of Brazil
Construction and civil engineering companies of Brazil
Companies based in Brasília
Mass media companies established in 1975
Construction and civil engineering companies established in 1975
Brazilian companies established in 1975

References